Te Sun Han (born 1941, Kiryū) is a Korean Japanese information theorist and winner of the 2010 Shannon Award.  He has made significant contributions concerning the interference channel and information spectrum methods.  In 1990, he was elected an IEEE Fellow for contributions to the theory of multiuser information systems and distributed signal detection systems.

References

External links
Te Sun Han's Webpage
 Citation for Shannon Award

Living people
1941 births
Fellow Members of the IEEE
Japanese information theorists